Courtyard Marriott is an international chain of hotels operated by Courtyard by Marriott owned by Marriott International. It is currently under construction and located in Agrabad, the central business area in Chattogram, Bangladesh. It is the second five-star hotel in the port city.

References

See also
 List of tallest buildings in Chittagong
 List of tallest buildings in Bangladesh

Buildings and structures in Agrabad